Lazaros Theodorelis (born 14 January 1982) is a Greek professional footballer currently playing for Platanias .

Career
Born in Drama, Theodorelis began his professional career with Doxa Drama F.C. in July 2003 and played for Greek Super League side Kavala during the three seasons, from 2008 to 2011.

References

External links
Profile at Onsports.gr

1982 births
Living people
Greek footballers
Doxa Drama F.C. players
Kavala F.C. players
Association football central defenders
Footballers from Drama, Greece